Psectrocera plumigera is a species of beetle in the family Cerambycidae, and the only species in the genus Psectrocera. It was described by John O. Westwood in 1848.

References

Lamiinae
Beetles described in 1848